The 84th Brigade was a formation of  the British Army. It was originally formed from regular army battalions serving away from home in the British Empire. It was assigned to the 28th Division and served on the Western Front and the Macedonian Front during the First World War. The Brigade was temporarily attached to the 5th Division between March and April 1915.

Formation
The infantry battalions did not all serve at once, but all were assigned to the brigade during the war.
2nd Battalion, Northumberland Fusiliers
1st Battalion, Suffolk Regiment 	 
2nd Battalion, Cheshire Regiment 	 
1st Battalion, Welsh Regiment 	 
1/6th (Glamorgan) Battalion, Welsh Regiment
1/1st Battalion, Monmouthshire Regiment
1/12th Battalion, London Regiment
84th Machine Gun Company
84th SAA Section Ammunition Column
84th Trench Mortar Battery

General Officers Commanding

References

Infantry brigades of the British Army in World War I